Nancy Wilson/Cannonball Adderley is a studio album by Nancy Wilson and Cannonball Adderley issued in February 1962 by Capitol Records. The album rose to No. 30 on the Billboard Top LPs chart.

Overview
Wilson considered her vocals on the album "as a sort of easy-going third horn" (Wilson quoted in the liner notes). All tracks were recorded in New York City, those with Wilson on June 27 and 29, 1961, and the instrumental tracks on August 23 and 24, 1961.

Reception

The Penguin Guide to Jazz states: "The odd session out is the date with Nancy Wilson for Capitol, primarily designed as a showcase for the young singer but with five band-only tracks as well. Wilson had a self-conscious phrasing and melodramatic lighting-up of key lines - but there is a version of 'A Sleeping Bee' here which is one of the most charming of all her recordings, and Cannon and the others play personably throughout." The AllMusic review by David Nathan concluded: "Given the play list and the outstanding artists performing it, why any serious jazz collection would be without this classic album is difficult to comprehend."

Track listing

Personnel 
 Nancy Wilson - vocals (tracks: 1 to 7, CD 1993)
 Cannonball Adderley - alto saxophone
 Nat Adderley - cornet
 Louis Hayes - drums
 Sam Jones - double bass
 Joe Zawinul - piano 
 Tom Morgan - producer

References 

1961 albums
Cannonball Adderley albums
Nancy Wilson (jazz singer) albums
Capitol Records albums
Collaborative albums